Acxocueitl was the first Queen consort of city-state of Tlatelolco.

She was a daughter of Acolmiztli and the princess, Tlazozomizqui. She married Quaquapitzahuac.

Their children were:
Tlacateotl
Matlalatzin
Huacaltzintli

She was a grandmother of the prince Tezozomoc and sister of Xiuhtomiyauhtzin.

References

Nahua nobility
Indigenous Mexican women
Nobility of the Americas